Edgar Leon Kirkpatrick (October 8, 1944 – November 15, 2010) was an American professional baseball outfielder and catcher. He played in Major League Baseball (MLB) from 1962 through 1977 for the Los Angeles / California Angels, Kansas City Royals, Pittsburgh Pirates, Texas Rangers, and Milwaukee Brewers.

Kirkpatrick helped the Pirates win the National League Eastern Division in the 1974 and 1975 seasons.

In 16 seasons, he played in 1,311 games and had 3,467 at-bats, 411 runs, 824 hits, 143 doubles, 18 triples, 85 home runs, 424 RBI, 34 stolen bases, 456 walks, .238 batting average, .327 on-base percentage, .363 slugging percentage, 1,258 total bases, 25 sacrifice hits, 39 sacrifice flies and 70 intentional walks.

Kirkpatrick recorded the final base hit (a single in the 8th inning) in the final game ever played at Kansas City's Municipal Stadium on October 4, 1972.

Kirkpatrick claims the city of Glendora, California where he graduated from high school as his hometown.  Glendora annually presents the Ed Kirkpatrick award to a citizen that has done the most for youth. In 1981, Kirkpatrick was leaving a charity event in La Habra, California, and he was involved in a seemingly minor car accident. A blood clot traveled from his neck into his brain the next day, and he suffered a heart attack during a subsequent brain surgery. He was in a coma for 5½ months and was left permanently paralyzed.  He died at the age of 66 in Mission Viejo, California after a long battle with throat cancer.

References

External links
Baseball Reference
Baseball Reference (Minors)
Retrosheet
Venezuelan League

1944 births
2010 deaths
American expatriate baseball players in Mexico
Arizona Instructional League Angels players
Baseball players from Spokane, Washington
California Angels players
Deaths from cancer in California
Deaths from esophageal cancer
Florida Instructional League Phillies players
Hawaii Islanders players
Industriales de Valencia players
Jacksonville Suns players
Kansas City Royals players
Leones del Caracas players
American expatriate baseball players in Venezuela
Los Angeles Angels players
Major League Baseball catchers
Major League Baseball first basemen
Major League Baseball outfielders
Mexican League baseball players
Milwaukee Brewers players
Nashville Vols players
Pittsburgh Pirates players
Plataneros de Tabasco players
Quad Cities Angels players
Salt Lake City Gulls players
San Jose Bees players
Seattle Angels players
Texas Rangers players